MacArthur's War: Battles for Korea is a 1988 video game published by Strategic Studies Group.

Gameplay
The player is a Corps commander in an operational-level simulation of a battle or series of engagements.

Reception
Jay C. Selover reviewed the game for Computer Gaming World, and stated that "Despite the tremendous sweep of the maneuvers during the first year, Korea has never been a "pretty" war and has always been seriously under-represented in wargaming. This alone makes MacArthur's War almost a "must". That the game is a darn good simulation, is easy to learn, and gives you a real feeling for the capabilities and operational limitations of both sides is just an added bonus."

Reviews
Review in Commodore Disk User
Review in Computer Games Strategy Plus
Computer Gaming World - Jun, 1991

References

External links
Review in Compute!

1988 video games
Apple II games
Commodore 64 games
Computer wargames
Cultural depictions of Douglas MacArthur
DOS games
Korean War video games
Turn-based strategy video games
Video games developed in Australia